Olivier Paquet (born 21 April 1973 at Compiègne) is a French political scientist and science fiction author.

Paquet graduated from the Institut d'études politiques de Grenoble in 1994 and went on to complete his DEA in 1995. He completed a doctorate in political science at the institution in 2002. As an author, he won the Grand Prix de l'Imaginaire award in 2002 for his short fiction Synesthésie, which was published in Galaxies magazine in 2000. His novel L’Esprit du Melkine won the  science-fiction award in 2014. He is also a columnist for the France Culture radio station and an anime and manga critic.

References

External links
Olivier Paquet official website 

1973 births
French political scientists
French science fiction writers
Living people
French male novelists
French male non-fiction writers